Mehmet Naim Talu (22 July 1919 – 15 May 1998) was a Turkish economist, banker, politician and former Prime Minister of Turkey.

Biography

Naim Talu was born in Istanbul in 1919. He was educated at Kabataş Erkek Lisesi. After graduating with a degree in economics from Istanbul University in 1943, he worked for a while in Sümerbank, a state owned textile company. He transferred to the Central Bank of Turkey in 1946. He became the general director of the bank in 1967 after serving one year as deputy. Following the reorganization of the Central Bank in 1970, he was appointed Governor of this institution. He died in Istanbul in 1998.

Political career

Naim Talu started his political career in 1971 by appointment to the ministry of trade in the second Erim cabinet. He kept his post also in the cabinet of Melen until President Cevdet Sunay admitted him to the Senate in 1972. Commissioned by President Fahri Korutürk following the resignation of Prime Minister Ferit Melen, he formed the 36th government on 15 April 1973 in consensus of the Justice Party with the Republican Reliance Party. His caretaker government lasted beyond the general elections in 1973, which did not set a clear majority for any party. With the forming of a coalition cabinet of the Republican People's Party along with the National Salvation Party under Bülent Ecevit on 26 January 1974, Talu's prime ministry ended. His membership in the Senate continued until 1976.

Naim Talu was a member of the board of Akbank, one of Turkey's largest banks, between 1974 and 1976, prior to his appointment as the chairman, which lasted until shortly before his death in 1998. He served the same period as a member of the board of trustees of the Sabancı Foundation VakSA.

He was survived by his wife Gevher Talu and his two daughters Tülin Talu and Füsun San.

References

External links
  Biography 
  Newspaper Hürriyet  
 Newspaper Hürriyet  

1919 births
1998 deaths
20th-century prime ministers of Turkey
Politicians from Istanbul
Istanbul University alumni
Turkish civil servants
Governors of the Central Bank of Turkey
Prime Ministers of Turkey
Turkish people in finance
Kabataş Erkek Lisesi alumni
Burials at Zincirlikuyu Cemetery
Government ministers of Turkey
Members of the Senate of the Republic (Turkey)
20th-century Turkish economists
Members of the 34th government of Turkey
Members of the 35th government of Turkey
Members of the 36th government of Turkey